M. P. Saminathan is the Minister for Information & Publicity in the 16th Legislative Assembly of Tamil Nadu. He was the Minister for Highways and Minor Ports in Tamil Nadu in the 13th Legislative Assembly (2006 - 2011).

He was born in Erode and his hometown is Muthur, Tiruppur District. He holds a Bachelor of Arts degree from PSG College of Arts & Science, Coimbatore.

He had a hat-trick assembly win in 1996, 2001 and 2006 from the Vellakoil Constituency. Vellakoil Constituency was announced as defunct for the 2011 elections. In 2011 & 2016 he had to change his constituency and lost in both the elections. In 2021, he emerged as a winner from the Kangayam Constituency.

He started his political career at a very young age. He first became an MLA in 1996 by defeating the former minister Durai Ramasamy. Saminathan was only 32 years old at that time.

References 

Dravida Munnetra Kazhagam politicians
Tamil Nadu ministers
Living people
People from Erode district
Year of birth missing (living people)
Tamil Nadu MLAs 1996–2001
Tamil Nadu MLAs 2001–2006
Tamil Nadu MLAs 2006–2011
Tamil Nadu MLAs 2021–2026